Besk or variant, may refer to:

Places
 Besk, Khoshab, Razavi Khorasan Province
 Besk, Sabzevar, Razavi Khorasan Province
 Besk, Torbat-e Heydarieh, Razavi Khorasan Province

Other uses
 BESK (Binär Elektronisk SekvensKalkylator, "Binary Electronic Sequence Calculator"), early Swedish computer

See also

 Nowy Besk (New Besk), Gmina Grabów, Łęczyca County, Łódź Voivodeship, Poland; a village
 Bäsk, a Swedish style spiced liquor flavored with wormwood
 Bask, Gilan, Iran; a village
 
 Bask (disambiguation)